Fred Flannery (30 March 1924 - 8 October 2012) was an Australian wrestler. He competed in the men's freestyle flyweight at the 1956 Summer Olympics. He represented Canada at the 1958 British Empire and Commonwealth Games.

References

1924 births
2012 deaths
Australian male sport wrestlers
Olympic wrestlers of Australia
Wrestlers at the 1956 Summer Olympics
Sportspeople from Melbourne
Commonwealth Games medallists in wrestling
Canadian male sport wrestlers
Commonwealth Games silver medallists for Australia
Commonwealth Games bronze medallists for Canada
Wrestlers at the 1954 British Empire and Commonwealth Games
Wrestlers at the 1958 British Empire and Commonwealth Games
Australian emigrants to Canada
20th-century Australian people
21st-century Australian people
Medallists at the 1954 British Empire and Commonwealth Games